The Budapest Hall of Art or Palace of Art,  (Hungarian − Műcsarnok Kunsthalle), is a contemporary art museum and a historic building located in Budapest, Hungary.

Description
The museum building is on Heroes' Square, facing the Budapest Museum of Fine Arts.

The art museum hosts temporary exhibits contemporary art.  It operates on the program of German Kunsthalles, as an institution run by artists that does not maintain its own collection. It is an Institution of the Hungarian Academy of Arts.  Its government partner is the Ministry of Education and Culture.

It has a bookshop, library, and the Műcsarnok Café that overlooks the square.

Building

The large Neoclassical style structure, designed by architects Albert Schickedanz and Fülöp Herczog, was completed in 1896.  It was originally built for millennium celebrations.

Its portico is in the Greek Revival style. The three-bayed, semi-circular apse houses a roofed exhibition hall with skylights. The building was renovated in 1995.

References

External links
 Institution of the Hungarian Academy of Arts  – official Budapest Műcsarnok Kunsthalle (Palace of Art) website—
 Budapest Tourism Office.hu: Palace of Art introduction—

Art museums and galleries in Hungary
Museums in Budapest
Contemporary art galleries in Europe
Modern art museums
Art museums established in 1896
Buildings and structures completed in 1896
1896 establishments in Hungary
Landmarks in Hungary
Greek Revival buildings
Neoclassical architecture in Hungary